Huaiyin District is one of 10 urban districts of the prefecture-level city of Jinan, the capital of Shandong Province, East China, forming part of the city's urban core. It borders the districts of Tianqiao to the northeast, Shizhong to the southeast, and Changqing to the southwest, as well as the prefecture-level city of Dezhou to the northwest.

Administrative divisions
As 2012, this district is divided to 12 subdistricts and 2 towns.
Subdistricts

Towns
Wujiabao
Duandian

References

External links
 Official home page

Huaiyin District
Jinan